Derek Partridge (born 29 June 1935) is a British television presenter, spokesman and voice-over artist, formerly a film and TV actor.

Partridge's father was a diplomat in the British Foreign Service.

In the 1960s, Partridge appeared in a numerous television series and films, including in the 1968 Star Trek episode "Plato's Stepchildren" as Dionyd.

In the 1970s Partridge moved to Rhodesia and presented a number of programmes for Rhodesian Television (RTV), including the popular shows Frankly Partridge and The Kwhizz Kids. He also was employed as a news anchor for RBC. During his time in Rhodesia, Partridge also wrote extensively, including publishing the books Thought-Provoking Thoughts About Living and Rhodesia – As It Really Is, which was later republished under altered titles, and a weekly column in Rhodesia's TV Guide.

In the 1980s Partridge appeared in a number of films and television episodes, including a leading role in the 1981 film Savage Harvest.

Partridge narrated the documentary Leslie Howard: The Man Who Gave a Damn sixty-five years after the downing of BOAC Flight 777, a passenger plane which was shot down by Luftwaffe patrol killing all aboard including actor Leslie Howard. Partridge was a child at the time, and he and his nanny were removed from Flight 777 to make room for Howard and Howard's traveling companion, who had higher travel priority.

In November 2012, Partridge appeared in a music video for the garage band The Mad Caps. The video for the song Baby Man features Partridge as the host of a fictional series entitled "Frame by Frame". He introduces the band and serves as a public service announcer halfway through the video .

Filmography

Film 
 Incident at Midnight (1963)
 King & Country (1964) - Captain Court Martial
 The High Bright Sun (released as  McGuire, Go Home! in the US) (1964) - MP Corporal (uncredited)
 The Murder Game (1965) - Police Sergeant
 Thunderball (1965) - Vulcan Navigator Plotter (uncredited)
 Where the Spies Are (1965) - Duty Officer
 The Killing of Sister George (1968) - Personal Manager (uncredited)
 The Ivory Ape (1980) - Aubrey Range
 Savage Harvest  (1981) - Derek
 My Tutor (1983) - Waiter
 The Down Home Alien Blues (2012) - Captain Pietr
 Dearly Departed (2013) - Cedric Longfellow
 Leslie Howard: The Man Who Gave a Damn (2016) – Narrator

Television

Studio 4 (1962) - Radio Operator
Dixon of Dock Green  (1962) - Doctor / PC Spriggs
ITV Television Playhouse (1963) - Hector
More Faces of Jim (1963) - Grigor
First Night (1963) - Jimmy Green
Espionage (1964) - Policeman
The Edgar Wallace Mystery Theatre (1963–64) - Peter / Detective
The Verdict (1963-1964) - Peter / Detective
Diary of a Young Man (1964) - German officer
Night Train to Surbiton (1965) - Policeman
Star Trek, "Plato's Stepchildren" episode (1968) - Dionyd
Frankly Partridge (1970s) – host of show 
The Kwhizz Kids (1970s) – host of show 
Remington Steele (1983) - Croupier
R.S.V.P. (1984) - Governor
T.J. Hooker (1985) - Croupier
Dallas (1986) - TV Announcer
Divorce Court  (1987) - Michael Pagent
Hunter  (1987) - Maitre 'D
Murder, She Wrote (1989) - Doctor
The Hidden Truth (1993) - host of special
The Naked Truth (1993) - host of special
Single & Searching: How to Find the Perfect Person for You (2002) - Himself	
The Indie Pendant (2004) - Himself
Baby Man by The Mad Caps (2012) - Himself
Star Wars Rebels (2015) - Admiral Brom Titus

References

External links

1935 births
Living people
English male television actors
English male film actors
English male non-fiction writers
English male journalists
Male actors from London
White Rhodesian people
Rhodesian writers
British emigrants to Rhodesia
British expatriate male actors in the United States